Megalographa culminicola is a moth of the family Noctuidae. It is found in the páramo zone, on altitudes between 3,300 and 3,940 m in the Andes in Ecuador and northern Peru.

External links
 A review of the genus Megalographa Lafontaine and Poole (Lepidoptera: Noctuidae: Plusiinae) with the description of a new species from Costa Rica

Plusiinae
Páramo fauna